Gymnopilus chrysopellus is a species of mushroom in the family Hymenogastraceae.

Description

Habitat and distribution
Gymnopilus chrysopellus has been found growing on dead wood in Cuba.

See also

List of Gymnopilus species

References

External links
Index Fungorum

chrysopellus
Fungi of North America